Vpopmail is an open-source GPL software package used for managing virtual e-mail domains and non password e-mail accounts on e-mail mail servers. It was originally developed by Inter7.

Features
 Support for 1 to 23 million virtual e-mail domains using a "grow as it goes" balanced directory tree
 Support for 1 to 23 million e-mail users per domain using the same balanced tree structure
 Automating e-mail configurations into scriptable command line programs and documented API library calls
 Automating Unix user/group/other permissions of directories and files
 Authenticated relay control of e-mail smtp servers
 Supports name or IP-based virtual domains
 Configurable logging
 Support for MySQL, Oracle, PostgreSQL, /etc/passwd, /etc/shadow, LDAP, Sybase, and default cdb authentication storage
 Delivers directly to Maildir for use with qmail-pop3d,  files or any other Maildir program
 Unique domains for each directory under vpopmail user with a Unique password files for each domain.
 Documented command line programs that can be used in scripts or for remote admin
 Documented C library for vpopmail features and transactions
 Daemon that manages mail accounts via TCP/IP control port

Operating system requirements
The minimum operating system requirement for vpopmail is
 FreeBSD
 Linux
 NetBSD
 OpenBSD
 Solaris
 Tru64
 HP-UX
 UnixWare

References

External links
sourceforge page
project homepage

Free email software